Aegeofusinus rolani is a species of sea snail, a marine gastropod mollusk in the family Fasciolariidae, the spindle snails, the tulip snails and their allies.

Description

Distribution

References

 Buzzurro G. & Ovalis P. (2005). Fusinus rolani: a new Mediterranean species. Triton 11: 1-3
 Russo P. (2017). New genus Aegeofusinus (Gastropoda: Fasciolariidae) to include small endemic species of the Aegean sea. Bollettino Malacologico. 53: 63-68

rolani
Gastropods described in 2005